Nikoslav Bjegović (Serbian Cyrillic: Никослав Бјеговић; born 16 November 1967) is a retired Serbian footballer.

Career
He played in FK Zemun, FK Partizan, FK Radnički Kragujevac, OFK Belgrade, FK Vojvodina (where he get to be the team captain) and FK Crvena Zvezda. In 2000, he emigrated to China where he played one season in Beijing Guoan. After that experience, he signed with Swiss club FC Lucerne where he helped the club in its return to the elite. But, the next season, there was a change in the club's direction and a new manager, so Nikoslav was informed that as the most expensive player in the squad, the club could not afford to keep him. He accepted but only by the terms that were written in the contract. That was the turning point in the relations and the torture begin, with him being transferred to the youth squad after not having accepted an offer of 50% of the contract. That's the main reason wy he played only eight matches in those two seasons in the Swiss club.

National team
He played one match for the FR Yugoslavia national team, it was on 23 December 1998 in Tel-Aviv, against Israel ( 0-2 loss).

Honours
Red Star Belgrade
First League of FR Yugoslavia: 1999–2000
FR Yugoslavia Cup: 1998–99 and 1999–2000

References

External links
 
 

Living people
1967 births
Sportspeople from Gospić
Serbs of Bosnia and Herzegovina
Serbian footballers
Serbia and Montenegro international footballers
Serbia and Montenegro expatriate footballers
Serbia and Montenegro footballers
Association football defenders
FK Zemun players
FK Partizan players
FK Radnički 1923 players
OFK Beograd players
Serbia and Montenegro expatriate sportspeople in Switzerland
FK Vojvodina players
Red Star Belgrade footballers
Beijing Guoan F.C. players
Expatriate footballers in China
FC Luzern players
Expatriate footballers in Switzerland
Serbia and Montenegro expatriate sportspeople in China